The Tack Factory was a historic industrial facility at 49 Tiffany Road in Norwell, Massachusetts, United States.  With its oldest portion dating to 1834, it was the last surviving 19th-century mill building in Norwell prior to its destruction by fire in 1983.  It was listed on the National Register of Historic Places in 1980.  For most of its history it was used in the manufacture of horse tack equipment.

Description and history
The Tack Factory was set on the west side of Tiffany Road, just south of Tiffany Pond.  At the southern end of the pond stands a dam, probably built in the early 20th century, which replaced an older 18th-century dam probably built for the grist mill that first stood at the site.  The main building, which stood across Third Herring Brook, was a single-story post-and-beam structure with a broad gable roof.  Its exterior had been covered with several layers of wood shingling, and a tall  brick chimney rose from the north slope of the roof.  Underneath the building was a granite sluiceway, in which the old waterwheel and related equipment could be found.  The main building was enlarged by three relatively small frame additions.

The factory was built in 1834 by Zephaniah Talbot and Samuel Salmond, who had acquired the water rights of the 18th-century mill that previously stood on the site.  The Salmond family operated the factory, producing horse tack for many years, until the mid-20th century.  The last occupant of the property was a printing company.

The factory was listed on the National Register of Historic Places in 1980.  It was destroyed by fire in 1983.

See also
National Register of Historic Places listings in Plymouth County, Massachusetts

References

Industrial buildings completed in 1834
Manufacturing plants in the United States
Industrial buildings and structures on the National Register of Historic Places in Massachusetts
Buildings and structures in Plymouth County, Massachusetts
Burned buildings and structures in the United States
Norwell, Massachusetts
National Register of Historic Places in Plymouth County, Massachusetts